The 2004–05 UEFA Champions League group stage matches took take place between 14 September and 8 December 2004. The group stage featured teams qualified by their league positions and others who had come through qualifying.

Seeding structure
The 32 teams were divided into four pots. Pot 1 comprised the previous year's title holders Porto and the top seven clubs in the team ranking. Pot 2 contained the following eight clubs in the rankings and likewise for Pots 3 and 4. Each group contained one team from each pot. A team's seeding was determined by the UEFA coefficients.

Clubs from the same association were paired up to split the matchdays between Tuesday and Wednesday. Clubs with the same pairing letter would play on different days, ensuring that teams from the same city (e.g. Milan and Internazionale, who also share a stadium) did not play on the same day.

Format
During the group stage, each team plays the other three teams in their group twice (home and away or at an alternative venue). The top two teams with the most points or who meet the tie-breaking criteria progress to the first knockout round. The third placed side entered the UEFA Cup in 2005.

Tie-breaking criteria
Based on paragraph 4.05 in the UEFA regulations for the current season, if two or more teams are equal on points on completion of the group matches, the following criteria are applied to determine the rankings:
higher number of points obtained in the group matches played among the teams in question;
superior goal difference from the group matches played among the teams in question;
higher number of goals scored away from home in the group matches played among the teams in question;
superior goal difference from all group matches played;
higher number of goals scored in all group matches played;
higher number of coefficient points accumulated by the club in question, as well as its association, over the previous five seasons.

Groups
Times are CET/CEST, as listed by UEFA (local times are in parentheses).

Group A

Group B

With Dynamo Kyiv leading 1–0, the match was abandoned at half-time after referee Anders Frisk was hit by an object thrown from the crowd. UEFA awarded Dynamo Kyiv a 3–0 win and ordered Roma to play their next two European games behind closed doors.

Group C

Notes

Group D

Group E

Group F

Group G

Group H

Notes

References

External links
Fixtures and results at UEFA.com

Group Stage
UEFA Champions League group stages